Nordeste (Portuguese for northeast, hence that part of the island) is a municipality on the northeastern part of São Miguel Island in the Azores.

Geography

The municipality Nordeste covers the northeastern part of the island São Miguel. It is the least populated on the island of São Miguel, and most of its interior is covered forests, mountainous peaks and river-valleys, punctuated by fertile pastureland. The highest elevations in this region include Pico Redondo (980 metres), Pico Verde (927 metres), Pico Bartolomeu (887 metres) and Pico da Vara (1103 metres), the highest point on the island of São Miguel.

Administratively, there are nine civil parishes in the municipality:
 Achada
 Achadinha
 Algarvia
 Lomba da Fazenda
 Nordeste  
 Salga 
 Santana
 Santo António de Nordestinho 
 São Pedro de Nordestinho

Sports
The following sports clubs are located in Nordeste:

 UD Nordeste
 CD Santo António Nordestinho

References

External links
 Fajã do Araújo
 Lombo Gordo
 Atlântico Nordeste. Migrações (Book)
 Official geographic portal : https://sigweb.cmnordeste.pt

 
Municipalities of São Miguel Island
Municipalities of Portugal